Ewout Albert Marie-Louise Denijs (born 4 February 1987 in Bruges) is a Belgian professional football player who plays for SK Rapid Leest. He usually plays as attacking midfielder.

Career 
Denys was plucked away by Cercle Brugge at a young age when he was playing for his home side SV Ruddervoorde, the same team where Thomas Buffel started his career. He made his début for the first team of Cercle on 9 September 2006 in a 1–2 win against SV Zulte Waregem. He was once in the starting eleven, against Lierse.

For the 2007-08 season, Denys is loaned to SK Deinze in the Belgian Second Division.

Denijs signed a contract with Standaard Wetteren on 29 May 2008.

In 2014 Denijs moved to third division side K. Rupel Boom FC.

External links
 
 
  

Living people
1987 births
Belgian footballers
Cercle Brugge K.S.V. players
K.M.S.K. Deinze players
S.C. Eendracht Aalst players
K. Rupel Boom F.C. players
Association football forwards
Belgian Pro League players
Footballers from Bruges